Elizabeth Ann McGraw is an American biologist who is a professor in entomology at Pennsylvania State University. She is the Director of the Center for Infectious Disease Dynamics and a Huck Scholar in Entomology. Her research investigates the bacterium Wolbachia as a strategy for biocontrol and to better understand the basis of its interactions with insects. She was elected a Fellow of the American Society for Microbiology.

Early life and education 
McGraw was an undergraduate biology student at the University of Michigan. She moved to Pennsylvania State University where she studied the evolution of virulence genes in human pathogens and was awarded a PhD in 1998.

Research and career 
After her PhD, she joined Yale University for her postdoctoral research, where she studied the Wolbachia insect system. She was particularly interested in being able to ask questions about the evolution of mutualism. She moved to the University of Queensland as a postdoctoral researcher.

McGraw was appointed to the faculty at the University of Queensland, then moved to Monash University as a Larkins Fellow in 2011, where she studied how bacteria affect host biology and how insects invest in response to a symbiont. She has extensively studied the endosymbiont Wolbachia. Wolbachia prevents harmful pathogens replicating inside mosquitos, which may offer hope for biocontrol against mosquito-borne diseases. Her research showed that when Wolbachia was inside mosquitoes it could prevent viruses from replicating. She showed that Dengue virus could not become resistant to Wolbachia, and that Dengue viruses grown with Wolbachia were less effective at infecting mosquito cells and were less able to replicate.

In 2017, McGraw joined Pennsylvania State University as a professor in entomology.

Awards and honors
McGraw was elected Fellow of the American Society for Microbiology in 2023.

Selected publications 
 A Wolbachia symbiont in Aedes aegypti limits infection with dengue, Chikungunya, and Plasmodium
 Successful establishment of Wolbachia in Aedes populations to suppress dengue transmission
 Phylogenomics of the reproductive parasite Wolbachia pipientis wMel: a streamlined genome overrun by mobile genetic elements

References 

Living people
University of Michigan alumni
Pennsylvania State University alumni
Pennsylvania State University faculty
Fellows of the American Academy of Microbiology
American entomologists
21st-century American women scientists
Women entomologists
20th-century American women scientists
20th-century American zoologists
21st-century American zoologists
Year of birth missing (living people)